La Carlota is a city in the south of the province of Córdoba, Argentina, about 110 km south of Villa María and 240 km from Córdoba City.

References

 
 Municipality of La Carlota (official website).

Populated places in Córdoba Province, Argentina
Populated places established in 1767
1767 establishments in the Spanish Empire
Cities in Argentina
Córdoba Province, Argentina
Argentina